National Secondary Route 257 is an arterial road from Route 32 to the Moín Container Terminal in the Caribbean sea of Costa Rica.

Description
This is a 2.3 km two lane road, one in each direction, that was created for the cargo transportation between Route 32 and Moín Container Terminal.

History
At the time of its construction, it was heavily criticized due to a critical geographic gaffe, as there was a problem of communication between the actors involved, with an 80m error in the design plans, and a whole new redesign was required for a much more expensive road than projected, at about an additional CRC ₡7,900 million, including an elevated highway with a length of 817m.

The country comptroller was involved in the investigation of the gaffe.

The road was opened for general use on 26 January 2018, it took eighteen months to complete.

References

Highways in Costa Rica